El Foûâra is a municipality in the Chouf District of the state of the Mont-Liban, Lebanon.

External links

Faouarat Jaafar, Localiban 

Populated places in Chouf District